Nikita Sergeyevich Goylo (born 10 August 1998) is a Russian football player. He plays for FC Pari Nizhny Novgorod on loan from FC Zenit Saint Petersburg.

Club career
He made his debut in the Russian Football National League for FC Zenit-2 Saint Petersburg on 17 July 2018 in a game against FC Tambov.

On 4 February 2022, Goylo joined Russian Premier League club FC Nizhny Novgorod on loan. He made his RPL debut for Nizhny Novgorod on 2 May 2022 against FC Arsenal Tula and saved a penalty kick on his debut in a 2–2 draw.

Career statistics

References

External links
 
 
 

1998 births
Footballers from Saint Petersburg
Living people
Russian footballers
Association football goalkeepers
Russia youth international footballers
FC Zenit Saint Petersburg players
FC Zenit-2 Saint Petersburg players
FC Akron Tolyatti players
FC Nizhny Novgorod (2015) players
Russian Premier League players
Russian First League players
Russian Second League players